Wave of Mutilation: Best of Pixies is a compilation album by Pixies. It was released on May 3, 2004 in the United Kingdom and the following day in the United States alongside a companion DVD featuring a live show, promotional videos and two documentaries. Early batches of the record feature a fault on the track "Hey", where Black Francis' opening shout of "Hey" is missing.

This album replaces 1997's compilation Death to the Pixies in 4AD's catalog, which previously served as the label's "greatest hits" collection for Pixies.

As of 2015, sales in the United States have exceeded 316,000 copies, according to Nielsen SoundScan.  In 2006 the album received a diamond certification for 250,000 copies sold in Europe by Independent Music Companies Association.

Track listing

Personnel
Pixies
Black Francis – Vocals, guitar
Kim Deal – Bass guitar, backing vocals, lead vocals on "Gigantic"
Dave Lovering – Drums
Joey Santiago – Lead guitar

Production
Steve Albini – Tracks 1, 5, 7, 15
Gary Smith – Tracks 2–4, 16, 23
Gil Norton – Tracks 6, 8–14, 17–22

Charts

Certifications

References

External links

2004 greatest hits albums
Albums produced by Gary Smith (record producer)
Albums produced by Gil Norton
Albums produced by Steve Albini
Pixies (band) compilation albums
4AD compilation albums